Hasarius adansoni, known commonly as Adanson's house jumper, is a species of jumping spider common and associated with people in most of the warmer parts of the world.

Distribution
H. adansoni is found in warmer climates around the world, for example Malta, India, Japan, Brazil, Taiwan and Australia. It has also been introduced worldwide in greenhouses and similar places, for example in several German zoos. In China it is distributed in the provinces of Gansu, Guangxi, Guangdong and Yunnan.

Description

Females grow up to 8 millimeters in length, males up to 6 millimeters.

The males are mostly black, with a red "mask" and pedipalps that are partly white. A white crescent is present on the back part of the abdomen, and another one on the front part of the opisthosoma. There are two small white dots on the posterior back, and two even smaller ones towards the end. These white areas - especially on the pedipalps - have a nacre-like iridescence.

Females are dark brown, with a lighter and somewhat rufous opisthosoma.

Behavior

These spiders build a silken retreat at night, which is about twice the length of the animal. Although the same retreat is sometimes reused, others are built in the vicinity.

Males have been seen to feed on immature females, although this may be by accident.

Nomenclature
This species was originally described as Attus adansonii by Audouin in 1826, then redescribed in officially recognised literature another 86 times by 2012, often being placed in other genera. The first placement into Hasarius was made by the French arachnologist Eugène Simon in 1871.

The species is named after the French naturalist Michel Adanson.

Gallery

Notes

References
Audouin, V. (1826). Explication sommaire des planches d'arachnides de l'Egypte et de la Syrie publiées ... in "Description de l'Egypte...". Histoire Naturelle 1(4):1-339 (arachnids, pp. 99–186).
Patoleta, B. & Zabka, M. (1999). Salticidae (Arachnida, Araneae) of Islands off Australia PDF
Peng, X-J. & Li, S. (2004). The Jumping Spiders from Dali, Yunnan, China (Araneae:Salticidae). The Raffles Bulletin of Zoology 52(2):413-417. PDF 
Duffey, E. (1964). The Terrestrial Ecology of Ascension Island. ''The Journal of Applied Ecology 1(2):219-251. PDF

External links

Pictures of H. adansoni 
Pictures of female and male
Wired 2011-01-26: Spiders Hunt With 3-D Vision

Salticidae
Spiders described in 1826
Cosmopolitan spiders